William Reid (1827 – March 16, 1906) was an American manufacturer and politician from New York.

Life 
Reid was born in 1827 in Hebron, New York. He attended Argyle Academy and initially worked in lumbering. He later worked as a manufacturer in West Hebron.

In 1891, Reid was elected to the New York State Assembly as a Republican, representing the Washington County 2nd District. He served in the Assembly in 1892. He also served as town supervisor for two terms.

Reid died at home in West Hebron on March 16, 1906. He was buried in New Hebron Cemetery.

References

External links 
 The Political Graveyard
 William Reid at Find a Grave

Republican Party members of the New York State Assembly
19th-century American politicians
Town supervisors in New York (state)
1827 births
1906 deaths
Burials in New York (state)
People from Hebron, New York